Dana Chisnell is an American public interest technologist, civic designer, adjunct lecturer and Fellow at the Harvard Kennedy School of Government.

Career 
Chisnell began her career in 1987, working with banks, insurance companies, and tech companies as a designer and usability researcher. In 2001, Chisnell began consulting as UsabilityWorks.

In 2013, Chisnell co-founded the Center for Civic Design, a non-profit focused on voter intent through design. Chisnell served as co-executive director with Whitney Quesenbery until January 2020. As part of the center, Chisnell led research on what became the Anywhere Ballot and was the originator and managing editor of the Field Guides to Ensuring Voter Intent. The Field Guides are featured in a collection on Design and Democracy hosted by the Cooper Hewitt Museum and Smithsonian Design Museum.

In 2014, Chisnell was a founding member of the United States Digital Service in the Executive Office of the President of the United States.

Chisnell taught a course on Designing Government as an Adjunct Lecturer at the Harvard Kennedy School from 2017 to 2020.

Chisnell is the co-author of the Handbook of Usability Testing Second Edition (Wiley 2008).

Achievements and Awards 
In 2019, Chisnell was named by Apolitical as one of the world's most influential people in digital government.

Bibliography 
Books
 Jeffrey Rubin & Dana Chisnell, Spool, Jared M. Handbook of Usability Testing: How to Plan, Design, and Conduct Effective Tests.
 Taylor, Lee & Dana Chisnell. FutureTense Texture: Effective Web Design in 3 Days
 Taylor, Lee & Jennifer Atkinson, Dana Chisnell. NetObjects Fusion 2.0: Effective Web Design in 3 Days

Articles
 Chisnell, Dana. "Democracy is a design problem." Journal of Usability Studies 2016: 124-130
 Redish, Ginny & Dana Chisnell, Sharon Laskowski, Svetlana Lowry. "Plain language makes a difference when people vote." Journal of Usability Studies 2010: 81-103
Chisnell, Dana. "Talking to strangers on the street: Recruiting through intercepting people." User Experience Magazine 2015
Chisnell, Dana. "How to KJ: Setting priorities quickly." User Experience Magazine 2014
Quesenbery, Whitney and Dana Chisnell. "Voting in New York City: Why is ballot design so hard to get right?" User Experience Magazine 2011

References 

Living people
Year of birth missing (living people)
Executive Office of the President of the United States
American non-fiction writers